"Love X Love" is a song written by Heatwave's keyboard player Rod Temperton and recorded by American guitarist and singer George Benson. Featured on Benson's Give Me the Night album, it was also released as a single. In Britain, it entered the UK Singles Chart on 26 July 1980 and reached a peak position of number 10, remaining in the chart for eight weeks. In the US "Love X Love" made the Hot 100 and was a Top 10 soul hit.

Chart positions

References 

1980 singles
George Benson songs
Warner Records singles
1980 songs
Songs written by Rod Temperton